The Mosaic Company is a Fortune 500 company based in Tampa, Florida which mines phosphate, potash, and collects urea for fertilizer, through various international distribution networks, and Mosaic Fertilizantes. It is the largest U.S. producer of potash and phosphate fertilizer.

Overview
The Mosaic Company was formed in October 2004 by a merger between IMC Global, a fertilizer company formed in 1909, and Cargill's crop nutrition division.
It is a combined producer and marketer of concentrated phosphate and potash with a customer base which includes wholesalers, retail dealers and individual growers worldwide. Its headquarters are in Tampa, Florida and it employs approximately 13,000 people in eight countries.

Products

Potash

Mosaic has approximately 10.4 million tonnes of operational potash capacity. Mosaic currently owns potash mines or surface mills at; Belle Plaine, Colonsay, Esterhazy K1, Esterhazy K2, Esterhazy K3 and Carlsbad, with another potash mine recently purchased in Brazil during the Vale Fertilizantes acquisition. Colonsay mine and mill has been indefinitely idled and is currently in care and maintenance mode. Esterhazy K3, currently in development, consists of an underground mine and service/production shafts separate from the K1 and K2 underground mine that is beginning to supply the K1 and K2 surface facilities with ore. Esterhazy K3 does not have surface milling and storage facilities, instead it is intended to replace the ore currently mined from the K1 and K2 mine. This shift in production will decrease brine management costs of the K1 and K2 mine, which stood at $108.0 million for 2020.

Mosaic is a member of Canpotex, an export association of Canadian potash producers through which they sell their Canadian potash outside the U.S. and Canada.

Potash mines are located in:
 Carlsbad, New Mexico
 Belle Plaine, Saskatchewan
 Colonsay, Saskatchewan
 Esterhazy, Saskatchewan K1
 Esterhazy, Saskatchewan K2
 Esterhazy, Saskatchewan K3

Phosphate
Mosaic has approximately 16.8 million tonnes of operational capacity for finished concentrated phosphates.  Mosaic is the largest producer of finished phosphate products with an annual capacity greater than the next two largest producers combined. It has a global distribution network made up of plants, port facilities, warehouses and sales offices. In 2013 Mosaic produced 7.6 million tons of concentrated phosphate crop nutrients and over 15 million tons of phosphate rock production. In October, 2013, Mosaic reached an agreement to purchase the phosphate operations of CF Industries for 1.4 billion dollars, which eliminates the need for Mosaic to spend an additional billion dollars to build a new processing facility in Hardee County, Florida to process the rock from their mines in that area.

Phosphate mines are located in the Bone Valley Formation of the Peace River watershed in Central Florida:
 Fort Meade
 South Pasture
 Four Corners
 Wingate Creek
 Fort Lonesome(Closed)

Mosaic owns a 25% stake of the Ma'aden Wa'ad Al Shamal Phosphate Company joint venture in Saudi Arabia.

With the completion of the Vale Fertilizantes acquisition in January, 2018, an additional 5 Brazilian phosphate rock mines, 4 chemical plants and an additional 40% economic interest in the Miski Mayo mine were purchased.

Carbon footprint
The Mosaic Company reported Total CO2e emissions (Direct + Indirect) for 31 December 2020 at 4,920 Kt (+340/+7.4% y-o-y). There is little evidence of a consistent declining trend as yet.

Timeline

2018
January: Mosaic completes acquisition of Vale Fertilizantes.
2015
 August: Joc O'Rourke succeeds Jim Prokopanko as Mosaic's president and CEO.
2014
 December: Mosaic acquires Archer Daniels Midland Company's (ADM) fertilizer distribution business in Brazil and Paraguay.
 July: Cargill acquired Mosaic's Hersey, Michigan salt plant.
2013
 November: Mosaic closed the potash operations at their Hersey, Michigan facility.
2011
 May: Mosaic and Cargill complete the transaction to split off and distribute Cargill's stake in Mosaic.
 January: Mosaic and Cargill agree to split off and orderly distribute Cargill's stake in Mosaic.
2007
 January: Jim Prokopanko succeeds Fritz Corrigan as president and CEO of Mosaic.
2006
 July: Jim Prokopanko named Mosaic Chief Operating Officer.
2004
 October: The Mosaic Company (NYSE: MOS) begins trading on the New York Stock Exchange.
 June: Mosaic announced as the chosen name for the newly formed company.
 January: The crop nutrition business of Cargill, Inc. and IMC Global enter into a definitive agreement to form a new crop nutrition company.

References

External links
 Official website

Companies listed on the New York Stock Exchange
Cargill
Fertilizer companies of the United States
Companies based in Tampa, Florida
Phosphate mines in the United States
Mining companies of the United States
Mining companies of Canada
Potash mines
American companies established in 2004
Non-renewable resource companies established in 2004
2004 establishments in the United States